Mark Newman  is an English–American physicist and Anatol Rapoport Distinguished University Professor of Physics at the University of Michigan, as well as an external faculty member of the Santa Fe Institute.  He is known for his fundamental contributions to the fields of complex networks and complex systems, for which he was awarded the 2014 Lagrange Prize.

Career

Mark Newman grew up in Bristol, England, where he was a pupil at Bristol Cathedral School, and earned both an undergraduate degree (1988) and a PhD (1991) in physics from the University of Oxford, before moving to the United States to conduct research first at Cornell University and later at the Santa Fe Institute, a private research institute in northern New Mexico devoted to the study of complex systems. In 2002 Newman moved to the University of Michigan, where he is currently the Anatol Rapoport Distinguished University Professor of Physics and a professor in the university's Center for the Study of Complex Systems.

Research
Newman is known for his research on complex networks, and in particular for work on collaboration patterns of scientists, random graph theory, assortative mixing, community structure, percolation theory, and network epidemiology.  He was also co-inventor, with Michael Gastner, of a method for generating density-equalizing maps or cartograms, which forms the foundation for the Worldmapper web site.  Their work gained attention following the 2004 US presidential election when it was used as the basis for a widely circulated map of the election results, which adjusted the size of states based on their population to give a more accurate sense of how many voters voted for each party.

Newman's network-based methods have been applied to a variety of fields, including psychology, sociology, economics and biology. The same basic methods have accurately predicted a wide variety of results, from relationships between organisms in an ecosystem to associations between terrorist organizations. Newman has also studied the risk of forest fires and the social behavior of dolphins in New Zealand, as well as the structure of the scientific community itself.

Newman has worked on power-law distributions in complex systems, including in the distribution of wealth, the sizes of cities, and the frequency of words in languages (see Zipf's Law).  With collaborators Aaron Clauset and Cosma Shalizi, Newman developed statistical methods for analyzing power-law distributions and applied them to the study of a wide range of systems, in various cases either confirming or denying the existence of previously claimed power-law behaviors.

Newman's paper "The structure and function of complex networks" received the most citations of any paper in mathematics between 2001 and 2011.

Awards and honors
In 2007, Newman was elected as a Fellow of the American Physical Society (APS). In 2011 and 2012, he received a Faculty Recognition Award and an Excellence in Education Award, both from the University of Michigan. In 2014, he was elected as a Fellow of the American Association for the Advancement of Science (AAAS), received the 2014 Lagrange Prize from the ISI Foundation, and was the fifth recipient of the Zachary Karate Club CLUB prize. In 2016, he was elected as a Simons Fellow in Theoretical Physics and received a Guggenheim Fellowship. He is the recipient of the 2021 Euler Award of the Network Science Society.
On May 11, 2022, he was announced a fellow of the Royal Society.

See also
Complex network
Social network
Random graph
Assortative mixing
Community structure
Percolation theory
Cartogram

Selected publications

Books

. Second edition, September 2018

Articles

References

English physicists
University of Michigan faculty
Alumni of Merton College, Oxford
Complex systems scientists
Year of birth missing (living people)
Living people
English emigrants to the United States
Santa Fe Institute people
Network scientists
Fellows of the Royal Society
Fellows of the American Physical Society